Municipalities  are the basic units of local government in Turkey.  According to the Turkish Statistical Institute the population of Turkey was 76,667,864 as of 31 December 2013. The majority of the population live in settlements with municipalities.  The number of municipalities in Turkey was 2,947 in 2009.  But in 2013, most of the small town municipalities were merged to district municipalities by the Act 6360 which came into effect at the 2014 local elections sharply decreased the number of municipalities to 1,394.

Types of municipalities

First Tier

Metropolitan municipality

A Metropolitan municipality is a municipality on the same level as that of the provinces.  In 2013, Act 6360 established metropolitan municipalities in all provinces with a population in excess of 750,000.  Formerly incorporating only the urbanized central district and the surrounding urbanized districts of the province in which they existed, the new law incorporates all districts, rural and urban, of the province effectively abolishing the province.  Within the districts of the newly created metropolitan municipalities, all existing town municipalities, villages, and rural territory were merged with the district center municipalities so that all districts became second-tier municipalities.

Second Tier

Province center municipality
A province center municipality is a municipality in which the government of a province (special provincial administration) is based. All province centers also serve as district centers for the district in which they are located.  With the reorganization they ceased to exist in the 30 provinces which became metropolitan municipalities, but continued in the other 51 provinces.

District municipality
A district municipality is a municipality associated with district centers.  They serve as the administrative center of a district, and exist in both the provinces and metropolitan municipalities.  In the provinces with a metropolitan municipality, the district municipality is subordinate to the metropolitan municipality and it is responsible for all the settlements in the district area (urban and rural).  In other provinces, the district municipalitity is independent of any other town municipalities which may exist in the district being only responsible for the main settlement of the district.

Town municipality
A town municipality is a municipality associated with all other towns and small cities which aren't district centers.  Originally present in all provinces of Turkey, they ceased to exist in metropolitan municipalities where they were merged with district municipalities, but still exists in the 51 regular provinces.

Number of municipalities
, the number of municipalities in Turkey is 1,391.

References

Geography of Turkey
2013 in Turkey
Local government in Turkey
Recep Tayyip Erdoğan controversies